This is a list of all of the free-to-air channels that are currently available via satellite from SES Astra satellites (Astra 2E/2F/2G) located at 28.2°E serving Ireland and the United Kingdom. Sky and Freesat use this satellite to deliver their channels. If one was to change providers between Sky and Freesat, one would not require a realignment of the satellite dish.

Key

Prominence of HD channels
Channel numbers sometimes differ between HD boxes and standard boxes. On HD boxes, HD channels are generally given prominence over the SD counterpart (though it does not apply in all regions of the UK in some cases). For this article, it is assumed that the subscriber has the HD pack (Sky) or a HD box (Freesat).

Channel sections

Note: Channel numbers listed for Sky are for the United Kingdom only. In Ireland, some channels not be on the channel number listed or may not be present on the EPG and require manual tuning. Officially, Freesat is not available in Ireland.

Entertainment and documentaries

Local

Regional and interactive

Notes for the Interactive section:
 Temp Temporary channel for events such as the Olympics, Wimbledon Championships, music events, etc. These channels are not always active.

Movies

Notes for the Movies section:
 IreEnc In the Ireland advertising region, these channels are encrypted and require a subscription. Therefore, these frequency values are omitted.

Music

Sports

News

Religion

Kids

Shopping

International

Radio

Information

References
 General
 King Of Sat
 Lyngsat

 Specific

Free-to-air channels in the UK
Broadcasting lists